Spirit Song is an album by pianist Kenny Barron recorded in New York in 1999 and released on the Verve label.

Reception 

In the review on AllMusic, Michael G. Nastos noted that "Barron has amassed a formidable number of high-quality recordings, but this ranks right up there near the top". In JazzTimes, Josef Woodard wrote: "The sum effect is a varietal garden of sounds and ideas, within the framework of Barron’s post-mainstream jazz sensibility".

Track listing 
All compositions by Kenny Barron except where noted.

 "The Pelican" – 4:12
 "Spirit Song" – 5:42
 "Um Beijo" – 7:31
 "Passion Flower" (Billy Strayhorn) – 9:54
 "Passion Dance" (McCoy Tyner) – 6:12
 "Sonja Braga" – 6:25
 "The Question Is" – 5:21
 "The Wizard" – 7:59
 "Cook's Bay" – 7:05
 "And Then Again" – 4:35

Personnel 
Kenny Barron – piano
Eddie Henderson – trumpet (tracks 1–4 & 6–9)
David Sánchez – tenor saxophone (tracks 1–9)
Regina Carter – violin (tracks 3 & 4)
Russell Malone – guitar (tracks 2, 8 & 10)
Rufus Reid – bass (tracks 1–4 & 6–9)
Billy Hart – drums (tracks 1–4 & 6–9)
Michael Wall Grigsby – percussion (track 2)

References 

Kenny Barron albums
2000 albums
Verve Records albums